Evans Lescouflair is a Haitian politician. He formerly served as Minister of Youth, Sports and Civic Action and as leader of the Cooperative Action to Build Haiti political party.

He has faced several allegations of having committed sexual assault. In 2015, Himmler Rebu, who was then serving as Haitian Minister of Sports, accused Lescouflair of having abused youth sports players. In March 2022, additional allegations of sexual abuse surfaced against him, including from youth former members of the Club Sportif Saint-Louis and from Claude-Alix Bertrand, the Haitian ambassador to UNESCO. On 2 July that year, he was arrested in Panama.

References 

Haitian politicians
Year of birth missing (living people)
Living people